Mir Ali Dost Bugti (Urdu: مير  علي دوست بگتی) (18 October 1920 – 8 July 1984), was the first Pakistani judge of Baloch ancestry of Balochistan High Court.

He was born in Dera Bugti. He studied until 5th grade in Dera Bugti, the highest level of education available there, then went to Sibi for matriculation (graduating school). Mir Bugti did his masters and he received an LLB degree from Aligarh Muslim University in Delhi, India. Mir Bugti was a High Court judge in Quetta, Balochistan, Pakistan.

Pakistani judges
1920 births
1984 deaths
People from Dera Bugti District
Baloch people
Faculty of Law, Aligarh Muslim University alumni
Chief Justices of the Balochistan High Court